Jushan or Jowshan may refer to several places:
 Jushan, Isfahan (جوشان - Jūshān), a village in Iran
 Jowshan, Kerman (جوشان - Jowshān), a village in Iran
 Jushan, Kurdistan (جوشن - Jūshan), a village in Iran
 Jushan, Lorestan (جوشان - Jūshān), a village in Iran
 Jowshan Rural District, an administrative subdivision of Kerman Province, Iran

See also
 Kim Young-sam (1927–2015), Korean politician